Señorita República Dominicana 1980 was held on April 19, 1979. There were 18 candidates who competed for the national crown. The winner represented the Dominican Republic at the Miss Universe 1980 . The Señorita República Dominicana Mundo entered the Miss World 1980 pageant. The Señorita República Dominicana Internacional would have entered Miss International 1980.  The Señorita República Dominicana Café would have entered Reinado Internacional del Café 1980.

Results
Internacional

Delegates

Azua - Gloria Pages Fernández
Barahona - Sofia Betances Ferreira
Distrito Nacional - Anna Teresa Marte
Distrito Nacional - Francia Batista Read
Distrito Nacional - Laura Fernández
Distrito Nacional - Matty Rodríguez Guerrero
Distrito Nacional - Milagros Germán
Espaillat - Aurora Marmolejos
Monte Cristi - Nolis Moya
Puerto Plata - Amelia Gómez
Puerto Plata - Patricia Ynoa Vega
San Pedro de Macorís - Bettina Morey Haché
San Pedro de Macorís - Patty Abud
Santiago - Ana María Ramírez Bobadilla
Santiago - Isabel Martínez
Santiago - Patricia Amelia Polanco Alvarez
Santiago - Roxanna de los Santos
Valverde Mao - Miguelina Rosas

External links
 https://web.archive.org/web/20090211102742/http://ogm.elcaribe.com.do/ogm/consulta.aspx

Miss Dominican Republic
1980 beauty pageants
1980 in the Dominican Republic